Jordan Loreto Perruzza (born January 16, 2001) is a Canadian soccer player who plays as a forward for Major League Soccer club Toronto FC.

Early life
Perruzza began playing youth soccer with Woodbridge Strikers and Vaughan SC. In December 2012, he joined the Toronto FC Academy. In 2014, he moved to Italy joining the youth setup of Empoli, where they got him an Italian passport, through his Italian heritage.

Club career

Toronto FC 
Perruzza joined Toronto FC II in August 2018. He scored his first goal for the club against Louisville City FC on October 8, 2018. On August 20, 2020, Perruzza signed a first-team deal with Toronto FC, which will become effective on January 1, 2021.

Loan to San Antonio FC 
On September 8, 2020 he was loaned to USL Championship side San Antonio FC. He scored his first goals for San Antonio on September 19, netting a brace in a 2–0 victory over the Oklahoma City Energy. On May 20, 2021, he returned to San Antonio FC on loan. In his first match on May 22, he scored the winning goal in the 81st minute against Birmingham Legion FC. He was later loaned to Toronto FC II for some matches.

Return to Toronto FC 
He scored his first MLS goal on October 30 against Atlanta United. In January 2022 Toronto FC announced they had signed Perruzza to a new deal through 2024, with an option for 2025. On July 27th 2022, during the penalty kick series in the Canadian Championship Cup Final against the Vancouver Whitecaps, Perruzza taunted the Whitecaps fans mockingly after scoring his penalty, only for Toronto to lose in the shootout.

International career
Peruzza was born in Canada to an Italian father and a Canadian mother. Peruzza was named to the Canadian U20 team for the 2018 CONCACAF U-20 Championship on October 24, 2018. Perruzza was named to the Canadian U-23 provisional roster for the 2020 CONCACAF Men's Olympic Qualifying Championship on February 26, 2020.

Career statistics

Club

Honours
Toronto FC
Canadian Championship: 2020

References

External links
 
 
 Jordan Perruzza at Toronto FC
 
 

2001 births
Living people
Canadian soccer players
Canada men's youth international soccer players
Association football forwards
Canadian people of Italian descent
Homegrown Players (MLS)
Soccer players from Toronto
Toronto FC players
Toronto FC II players
USL Championship players
USL League One players
Major League Soccer players
Canadian expatriate soccer players
Expatriate soccer players in the United States
Canadian expatriate sportspeople in the United States
San Antonio FC players
Vaughan Azzurri players
Woodbridge Strikers players
Empoli F.C. players
MLS Next Pro players